Carey Mulligan is an English actress. After playing minor roles in several films and television shows, Mulligan starred in her first major role in Lone Scherfig's coming-of-age drama film An Education (2009), which earned her the BAFTA Award for Best Actress in a Leading Role, and she was nominated for the Academy Award for Best Actress and the Golden Globe Award for Best Actress in a Motion Picture – Drama. The following year, Mulligan won the BIFA Award for Best Performance by an Actress in a British Independent Film for playing in the dystopian romantic Never Let Me Go, based on the 2005 novel of the same name by Kazuo Ishiguro. In 2011, she earned further acclaim for her supporting performances in Nicolas Winding Refn's action drama Drive and Steve McQueen's erotic drama Shame, the former of which earned her a nomination for the BAFTA Award for Best Actress in a Supporting Role.

Mulligan's performance as Daisy Buchanan in the 2013 film adaptation of F. Scott Fitzgerald's The Great Gatsby earned her nomination for the AACTA Award for Best Actress in a Leading Role. In 2015, Mulligan was nominated for the Tony Award for Best Actress in a Play for her performance in the Broadway revival of David Hare's Skylight.

Major associations

Academy Awards
The Academy Awards, popularly known as the Oscars, are awards for artistic and technical merit in the film industry. The awards are an international recognition of excellence in cinematic achievements.

BAFTA Awards
The BAFTA Awards are presented in an annual award show hosted by the British Academy of Film and Television Arts to honour the best British and international contributions to film, TV and videogame products.

Critics' Choice Awards
The Critics' Choice Awards is an awards show presented annually by the Critics Choice Association to honor the finest in cinematic and television achievement.

Golden Globes Awards

Screen Actors Guild Awards
The Screen Actors Guild Awards (also known as SAG Awards) are accolades given by the Screen Actors Guild-American Federation of Television and Radio Artists (SAG-AFTRA) to recognize outstanding performances in film and prime time television

Tony Awards
The Antoinette Perry Award for Excellence in Broadway Theatre, more commonly known as the Tony Award, recognizes excellence in live Broadway theatre.

Miscellaneous awards

Australian Academy of Cinema and Television Arts Awards
The AACTA Awards are presented annually by the Australian Academy of Cinema and Television Arts to recognize and honor achievements in the film and television industry.

British Independent Film Awards
The British Independent Film Awards is an organisation that celebrates, supports and promotes British independent cinema and filmmaking talent in United Kingdom.

Drama Desk
The Drama Desk Awards are presented annually and were first awarded in 1955 to recognize excellence in New York theatre productions Off-Broadway and Off-Off-Broadway. Broadway productions were included beginning with the 1968–69 award season.

Empire Awards
The Empire Awards was an annual British awards ceremony honouring cinematic achievements in the local and global film industry.

Evening Standard British Film Awards
The Evening Standard British Film Awards is the only ceremony dedicated to British and Irish talent, judged by a panel of top UK critics.

Evening Standard Theatre Awards 
The Evening Standard Theatre Awards, established in 1955, are the oldest theatrical awards ceremony in the United Kingdom.

Gotham Award
The Gotham Independent Film Awards are American film awards, presented annually to the makers of independent films at a ceremony in New York City.

Hollywood Film Awards
The Hollywood Film Awards are an American motion picture award ceremony held annually since 1997, usually in October or November.

Independent Spirit Awards
The Independent Spirit Awards (abbreviated "Spirit Awards" and originally known as the FINDIE or Friends of Independents Awards), founded in 1984, are awards dedicated to independent filmmaking.

MTV Movie & TV Awards
The MTV Movie & TV Awards is an annual award show presented by MTV to honor outstanding achievements in films. Founded in 1992, the winners of the awards are decided online by the audience.

National Board of Review
The National Board of Review of Motion Pictures is an organization in the United States dedicated to discussing and selecting what its members regard as the best film works of each year

Palm Springs International Film Festival
The Palm Springs International Film Festival is a film festival held in Palm Springs, California. It holds a Film Awards gala honoring the best in film of the year.

Santa Barbara International Film Festival
The Santa Barbara International Film Festival (SBIFF) is an eleven-day film festival held in Santa Barbara, California since 1986.

Satellite Award
The Satellite Awards are annual awards given by the International Press Academy that are commonly noted in entertainment industry journals and blogs.

Saturn Awards
The Saturn Awards are American awards presented annually by the Academy of Science Fiction, Fantasy and Horror Films; they were initially created to honor science fiction, fantasy, and horror on film, but have since grown to reward other films belonging to genre fiction, as well as television and home media releases.

Teen Choice Awards
The Teen Choice Awards is an annual awards show that airs on the Fox television network. The awards honor the year's biggest achievements in music, film, sports, television, fashion, social media, and more, voted by viewers living in the United States.

Critics associations

References

Mulligan, Carey